George Bush (June 12, 1796 – September 19, 1859) was an American biblical scholar, pastor, abolitionist, and academic. A member of the Bush family, he is a distant relative of both President George H. W. Bush and President George W. Bush.

Biography 
Born in Norwich, Vermont, Bush graduated from Dartmouth College in 1818, and then studied theology at Princeton Theological Seminary, where he was a tutor 1823–1824. He was ordained in the Presbyterian ministry, spent four years as a Christian missionary in Indiana, and in 1831 became professor of Hebrew and oriental literature at New York University.

His first book, The Life of Mohammed, was the first American biography of the religious leader. It refers to Muhammad as "remarkable" and "irresistibly attractive", but is a largely negative assessment of him, depicting him as a fraud. It also takes a dim view of the state of Christianity of Muhammad's age. The book fell out of print, but became briefly controversial in Egypt in 2004.

In 1844 Bush published a book entitled The Valley of Vision; or, The Dry Bones of Israel Revived.  In it he denounced "the thralldom and oppression which has so long ground them (the Jews) to the dust," and called for "elevating" the Jews "to a rank of honorable repute among the nations of the earth" by restoring the Jews to the land of Israel where the bulk would be converted to Christianity. This, according to Bush, would benefit not only the Jews, but all of mankind, forming a "link of communication" between humanity and God. "It will blaze in notoriety....It will flash a splendid demonstration upon all kindreds and tongues of the truth."

Also in 1844, he published a monthly magazine called Hierophant, devoted to the elucidation of scriptural prophecies, and he issued, in New York, a work entitled Anastasis, in which he opposed the doctrine of the literal resurrection of the body. Attacks upon this latter work, which attracted much attention, he answered in The Resurrection of Christ.

In 1845 he embraced Swedenborgianism and went on to write many defenses of his new faith. He translated and published the diary of Emanuel Swedenborg in 1845, and became editor of the New Church Repository.

Published works 
 The Life of Mohammed: Founder of the Religion of Islam, and of the Empire of the Saracens New-York: Printed by J. & J. Harper 1831
 Treatise on the Millennium (1833)
 A Grammar of the Hebrew Language (1st edition: New York, 1835; 2nd edition: New York, 1839)
 The Valley of Vision; or, The Dry Bones of Israel Revived (New York, 1844)
 The Resurrection of Christ; in Answer to the Question, Whether He Rose in a Spiritual and Celestial, or in a Material and Earthly Body (New York, 1845)
 Illustrations of the Holy Scriptures (Philadelphia, 1845)
  The Soul; or an Inquiry into Scriptural Psychology, as developed by the use of the terms, Soul, Spirit, Life, etc., viewed in its bearings on The Doctrine of the Resurrection (New York, J.S. Redfield, 1845)
 Mesmer and Swedenborg (1847) Here he argued that the doctrines of Swedenborg were corroborated by the developments of mesmerism.
 New Church Miscellanies (1855)
 Priesthood and Clergy Unknown to Christianity (1857)
   Notes, Critical and Practical, on the Book of Genesis, 2 vols.
  Notes, Critical and Practical, on the Book of Exodus (Boston, 1871)
  Notes, Critical and Practical, on the Book of Leviticus
  Notes, Critical and Practical, on the Book of Numbers
  Notes, Critical and Practical, on the Book of Joshua
 Notes, Critical and Practical, on the Book of Judges (New York, 1862)
 Bible Atlas 
 Hebrew Grammar

See also 
 Bush family

References

External links 

 God's Sacred Tongue 
 University of Michigan Library's collection
 Biography from a New York Public Library exhibition guide
 The Life of Mohammed on Google Books
 USINFO clarification of relationship to president George W. Bush

1796 births
1859 deaths
American abolitionists
American biblical scholars
American Christian Zionists
American Hebraists
American Presbyterian ministers
American Swedenborgians
Bush family
Christian Hebraists
Christian scholars of Islam
Dartmouth College alumni
Forerunners of Zionism
Missionary linguists
New York University faculty
Presbyterian abolitionists
Presbyterian missionaries in the United States
Princeton Theological Seminary alumni